Ambrosio may refer to:

People
Alessandra Ambrosio (born 1981), a Brazilian model
Arturo Ambrosio (1870–1960), an Italian film producer
Fabrisia Ambrosio, Brazilian-born physical therapist and academic
Franco Ambrosio (1932–2009), an Italian businessman
Giovanni Ambrosio (1420–1484), Italian dancer and writer on dance (Guglielmo Ebreo da Pesaro)
Luigi Ambrosio (born 1963), an Italian mathematician
Thomas Ambrosio (born 1971), American political scientist
Vittorio Ambrosio (1879–1958), an Italian general from World War I and World War II

Other
 Ambrosio (horse), a racehorse
 Ambrosio Film, an Italian film production company that existed from 1906 to 1924

See also
D'Ambrosio
Ambrosiano (disambiguation)